WJKC (95.1 FM) is a radio station licensed to serve Christiansted, U.S. Virgin Islands. The station is owned by Radio 95, Incorporated.  It airs an Urban Contemporary/Hip Hop/Reggae format.

WJKC's programming is simulcast on ZJKC-FM (90.9 FM) in the British Virgin Islands.

The station has been assigned the WJKC call letters by the Federal Communications Commission since October 12, 1983.

Programming
Along with its usual music programming, one unusual feature of WJKC is a twice-weekly call-in program offering "free on-air psychic readings with Miss Lynn."

References

External links
 WJKC official website
 
 
 

JKC
Hip hop radio stations
Urban contemporary radio stations in the United States
Radio stations established in 1983
1983 establishments in the United States Virgin Islands
Saint Croix, U.S. Virgin Islands